The 46th Infantry Division (46-ya Pekhotnaya Diviziya) was an infantry formation of the Russian Imperial Army.

Organization
1st Brigade
181st Infantry Regiment
182nd Infantry Regiment
2nd Brigade
183rd Infantry Regiment
184th Warsaw Infantry Regiment
46th Artillery Brigade

Commanders
February-August 1915: Anthony Veselovsky

Commanders of the 2nd Brigade
1910-1915: Dmitri Parsky

References

Infantry divisions of the Russian Empire
Military units and formations disestablished in 1918